Jacqueline V. Lerner (born 1954) is Professor of Applied Developmental & Educational Psychology in the Lynch School of Education and Human Development at Boston College, where she has taught since 1996. She is a member of the Society for Research in Child Development, the International Society for the Study of Behavioural Development, and Psi Chi. With her husband and research collaborator Richard M. Lerner, she has been active in promoting the concept of positive youth development.

Personal life
Lerner was born Jacqueline Rose Verdirame in Flushing, New York, in 1954. She is married to Richard M. Lerner, who is also a psychologist; they live in Wayland, Massachusetts. They have three children and four grandchildren.

References

External links
Faculty profile

American women psychologists
21st-century American psychologists
Living people
1954 births
Developmental psychologists
People from Flushing, Queens
St. John's University (New York City) alumni
Eastern Michigan University alumni
Pennsylvania State University alumni
Boston College faculty
American women academics
21st-century American women
20th-century American psychologists